Martynovo is a rural locality (a village) in Bazhenovsky Selsoviet, Belebeyevsky District, Bashkortostan, Russia. The population was 21 as of 2010. There is 1 street.

Geography 
Martynovo is located 18 km southwest of Belebey (the district's administrative centre) by road. Bazhenovo is the nearest rural locality.

References 

Rural localities in Belebeyevsky District